An undershirt in American English (vest in British and South African English, banyan in the Indian Subcontinent, or singlet in Australia and New Zealand), is an article of underwear worn underneath a dress shirt (or sometimes T-shirt) intended to protect it from body sweat and odors. It can have short sleeves (T-shirt) or be sleeveless (A-shirt). The term most commonly refers to upper-body innerwear worn by males.

An undershirt may be worn to protect the body from stiff or otherwise uncomfortable fabric. It also makes dress shirts less transparent, to reduce the amount of sweat absorbed by the shirt's fabric. It can be worn during winter months as an extra layer of warmth, and reduces wear on the upper layers of clothing.

History
Factory mass-produced undershirts became common in the West in the early 20th century, with innovations turning the union suit into two pieces, for upper and lower body.

Types of undershirts

 A sleeveless undershirt, also known as an A-shirt, tank top, or wife beater (slang), has large armholes, a large neck hole, and offers little protection for armpit sweat.
 A crew neck T-shirt has a high neckline, often requiring fully buttoned shirts to avoid being seen.
 A V-neck T-shirt has a V-shaped neckline.
 A long sleeved T-shirt has long sleeves, and may be designed with extra insulation for use in cool weather. This type of shirt is also commonly worn under a work shirt in very hot desert climates to protect against intense sun.

References

History of clothing (Western fashion)
Undergarments